Jakob Marzel Sternberger (1750–1822) was the first mayor of the town of Kadaň after the municipal reform of Joseph II. He was a mayor from 1788 till 1822.

1750 births
1822 deaths
18th-century Bohemian people
German Bohemian people
Mayors of places in the Czech Republic
People from Kadaň